Branko Galoic  is a singer/songwriter and guitarist from Ivanić-Grad, Croatia.

Career
He started to play music at the age of 17 and is autodidactic.

He recorded the  album One with the wind with Portuguese guitarist Francisco Cordovil and, in the same year, he recorded another album  Carnet de Voyages that was released by French record label SuperPitch.

He has played hundreds of concerts around Europe including some notable festivals such as Rudolstadt-Festival where he played in front of ten thousand people with his Skakavac (Grasshopper) Orchestra.

His eclectic style is described as Balkan music mixed with difirent styles.

He has recorded 7 albums and lives in Paris.

References

External links
 Official site

Croatian musicians
Living people
Year of birth missing (living people)